Cham Deylavand may refer to:

Cham Deylavand-e Olya
Cham Deylavand-e Sofla